Douglas Glacier may mean:

Douglas Glacier (Antarctica)
Douglas Glacier (Washington), in North Cascades National Park, Washington, USA
Douglas Glacier (West Coast, New Zealand), in the Southern Alps of New Zealand
Douglas Glacier (Canterbury), in the Arrowsmith Range of New Zealand